Trypostegidae is a family of bryozoans belonging to the order Cheilostomatida.

Genera

Genera:
 Boreas Morris, 1980
 Boreasina Voigt & Hillmer, 1983
 Diplotresis Canu & Bassler, 1933

References

Cheilostomatida